Canton Fair Complex Middle station, is a station of Haizhu Tram of the Guangzhou Metro. It started operations on 31 December 2014.

References 

Guangzhou Metro stations in Haizhu District
Railway stations in China opened in 2014